Taunsa District (Urdu, Balochi, Punjabi,) is a district in the Punjab province of Pakistan.

Administration 
The district is administratively subdivided into four tehsils.

References 

Districts of Punjab, Pakistan
Taunsa District